House of Bryan is a Canadian home renovation television series which premiered in 2010 on HGTV Canada. The show follows Bryan Baeumler, host of Disaster DIY and Leave It to Bryan, as he manages a team of professionals and apprentices build a house. The show is produced by Si Entertainment. House of Bryan 1 set an audience record for HGTV Canada, in April 2010.

Seasons
In the first series, House of Bryan (later referred to as In the City;  House of Bryan 1), they renovate a small bungalow into a much larger dream home while under the careful watch of Baeumler's family.

A second series, House of Bryan: On the Rocks (provisionally House of Bryan 2), was produced. The show, which debuted in April 2012, focused on building the Baeumler family's cottage on Georgian Bay.

The third series, House of Bryan: In the Sticks (a.k.a. House of Bryan 3), was made. The show, which debuted in 2014, focused on building the Baeumler forever home, in the countryside, like where Bryan grew up, to give their children the advantages of country-living. They wanted to build a place to grow old in, and for their descendants to return to. The show focuses on building an extension to a house they've bought.

The fourth series, House of Bryan: The Final Straw (a.k.a. House of Bryan 4) debuted in October 2015. The show focuses on finishing renovations to the old section of the house they've built an extension to and landscaping.

Cast

 Bryan Baeumler as General contractor, homeowner, and series lead
 Sarah Baeumler as Bryan's wife
 Adam Weir as Bryan's apprentice

Episodes

Season 1: House of Bryan (2010)

Also called In The City

Season 2: On The Rocks (2012)

Season 3: In The Sticks (2014)

Season 4: The Final Straw (2015)

Spin-offs
For the Fall 2016 season, House of Bryan was replaced on the HGTV Canada schedule by Bryan Inc., where Bryan and wife Sarah Baeumler buy properties, renovate or replace (new build) the houses on them, and sell them for a profit, at Bryan's construction company, Baeumler Construction ("BQC").

For the Spring 2019 season, a similarly themed show to House of Bryan and Bryan Inc. premiered, Island of Bryan, where the Baeumler couple work to rebuild and restore a tropical island beachfront resort, Caerula Mar ("CM").

The 2022 season 4 of Island of Bryan involves the Baeumlers renovating their new house in Florida, in the same manner as House of Bryan documented earlier, with the exception of additional coverage of the Bahamas hotel resort, and an office renovation for Sarah's new Florida company, Baeumler Design Group ("SB").

References

External links
HGTV Canada: House of Bryan
HGTV Canada: Episode listing
HGTV Canada: Episode schedule

HGTV (Canada) original programming
2010 Canadian television series debuts
2015 Canadian television series endings
2010s Canadian reality television series
Bryan Baeumler television franchise
English-language television shows